Little Longnose (Karlik Nos) is a Russian traditionally animated feature film directed by Ilya Maximov. It was co-produced by Melnitsa Animation Studio and CTB, and is the first feature-length animated film by either company. The film is a combined adaptation of the fairy tales "Dwarf Nose" and "Little Muck" by Wilhelm Hauff.

It opened in Russia on March 20, 2003, and had 375,000 admissions during its theatrical run. A computer game based on the film was produced by Melnitsa, K-D Labs, and 1C.

Plot
A witch seeks out a kind-hearted child in order to awaken a great stone beast named Dagal. She tracks down Jacob, the son of the shoemaker Heinz and the grocer Hanna, and invites him into her castle. When Jacob refuses to aid the witch in her plan, the witch transforms him into an ugly hunchbacked dwarf with a long nose. The witch is convinced that Jacob will be unable to withstand the social rejection and return to her. Jacob finds that seven years have passed during his time in the castle; Heinz died of grief in Jacob's absence, and Hanna is unable to recognize Jacob upon his return. At the same time, the King's daughter Princess Greta is turned into a goose by the witch after she discovers her in her father's library stealing a spell which will help her rule the kingdom. Jacob and Greta meet and plan to overthrow the witch and get back to their families and true forms.

Cast
Albert Asadullin as Jacob
Elena Shulman as young Jacob
Evgenia Igumnova as Greta
Natalia Danilova as the Witch
Igor Shibanov as Urban
Ivan Krasko as the King

See also
 History of Russian animation
 List of animated feature films
 Konstantin Bronzit

External links
 Official site at Melnitsa
 

2000s children's animated films
2003 films
Films based on fairy tales
Films based on works by Wilhelm Hauff
Melnitsa Animation Studio animated films
Russian animated films
Russian children's fantasy films